He Garden is a park in Yangzhou, Jiangsu province. He Family Garden also known as “Jixiao Villa” is the last but best work among the private gardens in Yangzhou. Located on Xuningmen Street, it is a heritage site under state protection and a national AAAA-rated tourist attraction. It is the best-known private garden of the late Qing dynasty, and is one of 20 first-class key parks in China.As the development of Yangzhou’s tourism, He Garden will be a must-see place for tourists who travel in Yangzhou.

http://en.he-garden.net/abouthy.html

Name
The name "He Garden" is from a poem by Tao Yuanming. The original owner's last name was also "He".

Family Affairs & National Affairs

About the Master 

Born in 1835, He Zhidao (a 19th century Chinese envoy to France) had been appointed as the governor of Hangyang Prefecture, Huang-zhou Prefecture and De`an Prefecture, and supervisor of Jianghan Barrier. He was also awarded to be a top ranking official of the consulting minister and later to be grand minister of consultation. National Affairs Crisis

Since the country was surrounded by dangers then, He Zhidao could do nothing for his patriotism and anticipations to help the country become stronger and had to resign in middle age.

Chizhi University 

Subject to his last wish, He Zhidao's descendants established Chizhi University with his remaining capitals in 1924,more than years after his death.

After its establishment, Chizhi University had cultivated a lot of ambitious youths and made great contribution to the country in that age.

History
The He Garden is a typical residential garden, built in 1883 during the reign of the Guangxu Emperor in the Qing dynasty. The garden was built on the old site of the Garden of Double Pagoda Trees. And now there is still one pagoda tree left in He Garden. Its original name is translated "Mountain Villa for Ease of Singing". The owner was He Weijian, (also known as He Zhidao). He Zhidao was born in Wangjiang, Anhui. With his father's approval, he moved to Yangzhou, bought the site of the former Sliced Stone Mountain Villa, rebuilt and expanded it. When it was finished, the owner named the garden "Ease of singing" (borrowed from two lines of a poem, "On Returning Home", written by Tao Yuanming). Since the owner was named "He", the garden was called "He Yuan".

In Year 1937,the Japanese aggress China, occupied the three northeast provinces and a lot of parts of China. So some parts of hurt soldiers lived in "He Garden".

In Year 1988, "He Garden" was awarded the third "Major Historical and Cultural Site Protected at the National Level" by the state council together with "Ge Garden".

In Year 1989, "Pian Shi Shan Fang" was repaired.

In Year 2005, "He Garden" referred to as "the best classic Chinese garden in Qing Dynasty" for its combination of western architecture and the brilliant features of a private garden in Jiangnan[1] by Luo Zhewen (a leading academic on classical Chinese gardens).

Features
He Garden is recognized as one of the most remarkable private gardens recently created in Yangzhou.

The He Garden is a large private garden with a residence. The garden is highly cultivated; however, a visitor does not feel cramped because of the garden's layout. Around the garden there are only buildings, without mountains or running water. Absorbing the essence of traditional Chinese gardening, He Garden introduced western landscape architecture and has established its own style. Chinese experts on ancient gardens have long praised the art employed in building He Garden, calling it "a single case of gardens in South of the Yangtze River area".

The garden comprises three parts (the west and east gardens, the residential area and courtyard and the mountain villa) which are arranged in a chain. With both Chinese and Western features, the garden can be used as both a residence and a scenic spot. Its designer endeavored to create an ideal residence; their efforts are included in the book, The Wonders of Yangzhou City. He Garden is recognized as "the first celebrated garden in the city after the Xianfeng and Tongzhi emperors".

The Garden owner bring western architectural features back to the ancient China, and absorb Chinese royal gardens and jiangnan private gardens, also widespread use of new materials. So that make the garden absorb the experience of many gardens and at the same time have new stuff.

Famous views 
- Yuxiu Building

- Boat Hall

- Double-Path Cloister

- Butterfly Hall

- Rockery Built with Pieces of Stones

- Pond-Centered Pavilion

- Rockery Closely Sticking to the Wall

Photos

See also
List of Chinese gardens
Yangzhou
Ge Garden
Slender West Lake
Dongguan Street
Daming temple

References

Gardens in Jiangsu
Yangzhou
Major National Historical and Cultural Sites in Jiangsu
AAAA-rated tourist attractions